Khutorishche is a rural locality (a khutor) in Volokonovsky District, Belgorod Oblast, Russia. The population was 80 as of 2010. There are 3 streets.

Geography 
Khutorishche is located 21 km southwest of Volokonovka (the district's administrative centre) by road. Krasny Pakhar is the nearest rural locality.

References 

Rural localities in Volokonovsky District